The 2021–22 season is Birmingham City Football Club's 119th season in the English football league system and 11th consecutive season in the second-tier Championship. As with all English Football League clubs, the first team also competed in the FA Cup and EFL Cup.

The season covers the period from 1 July 2021 to 30 June 2022.

Background and pre-season

All Birmingham's home matches in the 2020–21 season were played behind closed doors because of the COVID-19 pandemic. Under head coach Aitor Karanka, Birmingham City gradually slid down the 2020–21 Championship table until, with ten games remaining and in serious danger of relegation, former Birmingham player Lee Bowyer resigned as manager of Charlton Athletic to take over as head coach. The team lost only one of the next eight matches and retained their Championship status with two games still to play. On 11 May 2021, CEO Ren Xuandong resigned.

In June 2020, the club announced a four-year partnership with Nike as supplier of kits, which carry the logo of the club's principal sponsor, Irish bookmaker BoyleSports. The home shirt has a camouflage-patterned front in two shades of blue, worn with white shorts and blue socks, while the away kit has a yellow shirt with blue pinstripes and trim, similar to the Europa League kit of ten years before, with blue shirts and white socks. In November, they brought out a limited-edition third kit; the shirt has a camouflage front in orange and green and a predominantly green back, and is worn with orange shorts and socks.

After a training camp in Scotland, Birmingham planned five pre-season friendlies: away to Cheltenham Town and Northampton Town, behind-closed-doors games at the Wast Hills training ground against Oxford Unitedwho cancelled due to COVID-19 and were replaced by a Salford City XIand Barrow, and one match at St Andrew's against West Bromwich Albion.

EFL Championship

League table

Results summary

Match results

FA Cup 

Birmingham City were drawn at home to League One club Plymouth Argyle in the third round.

EFL Cup 

Birmingham were drawn to play League One club Colchester United at home in the first round. Bowyer made 11 changes from the team that started at Sheffield United 72 hours earlier, giving debuts to Chuks Aneke, Jordan Graham and Marcel Oakley, and it was Oakley who scored the only goal of the game with a 75th-minute deflected shot. Tate Campbell made his Birmingham debut as a substitute, and Jobe Bellingham, the 15-year-old brother of England international Jude, was also named on the bench. In the second round they fielded a slightly less weakened team, but still made 10 changes from the previous league match, with Mitch Roberts, Dion Sanderson and (as a substitute) Alfie Chang making their first Birmingham appearances and Neil Etheridge returnng in goal after recovering from COVID-19. Opponents Fulham, newly relegated from the Premier League, scored midway through the first half after an error by Ivan Šunjić, but Birmingham held out until stoppage time before conceding a second.

Transfers
For those players released or contract ended before the start of this season please see 2020–21 Birmingham City F.C. season.

In

  Brackets round a club's name indicate the player's contract with that club had expired before he joined Birmingham.

Loaned in

Out

  Brackets round a club's name denote the player joined that club after his Birmingham City contract expired.

Loaned out

Appearances and goals
Sources: 

Numbers in parentheses denote appearances as substitute.
Players with name and squad number struck through and marked  left the club during the playing season.
Players with names in italics and marked * were on loan from another club for the whole of their season with Birmingham.
Players listed with no appearances have been in the matchday squad but only as unused substitutes.
Key to positions: GK – Goalkeeper; DF – Defender; MF – Midfielder; FW – Forward

References

External links

Birmingham City F.C. seasons
Birmingham City F.C.